Santa María Jacatepec is a town and municipality located in the state of Oaxaca 11 km north of the Valle Nacional.  "Jacatepec" comes from Nahuatl meaning 'on jackal hill.' 
It is part of the Tuxtepec District of the Papaloapan Region, and is only 30 meters above sea level.

The town

The town had its origins when the residents of San Juan Palantla needed to escape an epidemic that devastated the village. First they established a village they called Valle Real; however, because of the place's bad location, they moved on to several farming areas called San Pedro Ozumasín, San Mateo Yetla and Santa María Jacatepec. The last was established as a town in 1650 and then as at municipality in 1896.

Near the town are 3 springs called Tzul Zul, Paraíso Escondido and Arroyo Blanco which have been converted into recreational parks.

The municipality
As municipal seat, Jacatepec has governing authority over the following communities:

Boca de Perro, Cerro Caballo, Cerro Concha, Cerro de Viento, Cinco de Oro, Colonia Emiliano Zapata, Ejido Adalberto Vélez, El Diamante, El Fortín II, El Guayabo, El Hule (La Hulera), El Porvenir, Emiliano Zapata, La Florida, La Joya de Santa María, Lacatepec, La Nueva Esperanza, La Nueva Soledad, La Reforma, La Soledad, Loma del Carmen, Macedonio Alcalá, Nuevo Faisán, Nuevo Málzaga, Rancho Alegre, Rancho Faisán, Rancho Gavilán, Rancho Manantial, San Agustín, San Lorenzo, San Martín, Santa Sofía, Vega del Sol, and Vuelta Abajo (Lucero Alto)

References

External links
Maps of Mexico 

Municipalities of Oaxaca